Beverly Jean Wildung Harrison (1932–2012) was an American Presbyterian feminist theologian whose work was foundational for the field of feminist Christian ethics. She taught at Union Theological Seminary in New York City for 32 years.

Early life and education 
Beverly Jean Wildung was born in Saint Paul, Minnesota, on August 4, 1932. Her parents, Harold Wildung and Adahlia Knodt Wildung, were both Presbyterians and they had four children; Beverly was the youngest. She attended Macalester College, where she studied with Robert McAfee Brown. After graduating in 1954, she continued her education at Union Theological Seminary in New York City, where she earned a Master of Religious Education degree and her Doctor of Philosophy degree in 1975.

Career 
After serving as an assistant campus chaplain at the University of California, Berkeley, in the 1960s, she returned to Union Theological Seminary in 1966 to join the faculty as an instructor. She received tenure in 1980, and became the Caroline Williams Beaird Professor of Christian Ethics in 1986.

While at Union, she authored or co-authored several influential works on feminist Christian ethics. Her lectures on "The Power of Anger in the Work of Love" and "The Role of Social Theory in Religious Ethics" were distributed widely among students and faculty, before being added to a published collection of essays, called Making the Connections: Essays in Feminist Social Ethics (1985), which has been called "one of the best books ever published in feminist religious thought."

Her first published book Our Right to Choose: Toward a New Ethic of Abortion (1983), was significant contribution to the discussion of moral issues surround the abortion debate.  She was also a co-author and editor of God's Fierce Whimsy: Christian Feminism and Theological Education (1985), a collection of articles by Christian feminists of diverse backgrounds, published by the Mudflower Collective. By highlighting the perspectives of women of color and lesbians, God's Fierce Whimsy helped challenge the traditional canon and methodologies of Christian theological education.

In the 1970s Harrison co-founded the Feminist Ethics Consultation of the Northeast, a mentoring organization for women in ethics. In 1982, she became the first woman to be elected president of the Society of Christian Ethics. She retired in 1999.

Harrison died on December 15, 2012, in North Carolina.

Awards 
Harrison was given a lifetime achievement award from the Society of Christian Ethics posthumously, in 2013.

Works
Our Right to Choose: Toward a New Ethic of Abortion (1983)
Making the Connections: Essays in Feminist Social Ethics (1985)
God's Fierce Whimsy: Christian Feminism and Theological Education (co-author, editor) (1985)
The Public Vocation of Christian Ethics (co-editor) (1986)
Justice in the Making: Feminist Social Ethics (2004)

References 

1932 births
2012 deaths
20th-century American non-fiction writers
20th-century American theologians
Women Christian theologians
20th-century American women writers
20th-century Calvinist and Reformed theologians
20th-century Presbyterians
American Christian socialists
American ethicists
American women academics
American women non-fiction writers
Christian ethicists
Christian feminist theologians
Christian socialist theologians
Female Christian socialists
Lesbian academics
Macalester College alumni
Presbyterian socialists
Presbyterians from New York (state)
American socialist feminists
Union Theological Seminary (New York City) alumni
Union Theological Seminary (New York City) faculty
University and college chaplains in America
Writers from Saint Paul, Minnesota
21st-century LGBT people
21st-century American women